The 78th Road is one of the major roads in Mandalay, Myanmar. Its main parts started from the south of the Mandalay Palace, junction with 26th(B) Road, and end in the Sagaing Branch Road

Remark places 
Mandalay Central Railway Station
Diamond Plaza
Yadanabon Hall

Major junctions

26th (B) Road
30th Road
35th Road
Theikpan Road

References 

Roads in Myanmar
Mandalay